Tony Shalhoub is an American actor, and has won four Primetime Emmy Awards, a Daytime Emmy Award, a Golden Globe Award, six Screen Actors Guild Awards and a Tony Award. He's been nominated for a Grammy Award.

Major awards

Emmy Awards

Golden Globe Awards

Grammy Awards

Screen Actors Guild Awards

Tony Awards

Miscellaneous awards

American Film Institute Awards

Audie Awards

Chicago Film Critics Association Awards

Chlotrudis Awards

Critics' Choice Television Awards

Drama Desk Awards

Drama League Awards

Independent Spirit Awards

Monte-Carlo Television Festival

National Society of Film Critics Awards

New York Film Critics Circle Awards

Online Film & Television Association Awards

Online Film Critics Society Awards

Satellite Awards

Television Critics Association Awards

Notes

References

Shalhoub, Tony